Gustaf Werner Holmberg (1 November 1830 – 24 September 1860) was a Finnish landscape painter.

Biography

Early life
Holmberg was born in Helsinki. His father was Olof Henrik Holmberg (1799–1863) and mother Josefina Gustava Federley (1806–1840). His mother passed away from a lung disease and Olof raised his six surviving children with the help of his sisters. He also learned oil painting from Johan Erik Lindh. In 1848 he became a student at the just-formed Academy of Fine Arts. However his father Olof wanted his son to study law, so in his first year of university studies he also worked part-time at the National Board of Customs. At the university he learned painting from Berndt Godenhjelm and von Wright again. In 1850 he helped Robert Wilhelm Ekman paint frescoes in the Turku cathedral. In 1853 he finished his studies.

Study at Düsseldorf

In July 1853 he moved to Düsseldorf as the first Finnish art student, after many Norwegian and Swedish art students had already gone there to study. He studied there under Hans Gude. Erik Bodom was also recruited to help him with his work. Nordic topics were popular in Germany, and he first focused on them with works such as The Kyrö Rapids. His breakthrough was in 1856 with Autumn Morning, and with the new-found fame he was able to quickly sell all of his paintings. By this point Gude recognized Holmberg as fully trained and ended his tutorship, although they still kept close contact. As he ran out sketches of Finland, he began painting German landscapes.

After the study at Düsseldorf

In 1857, after four years of being away, he returned to Finland, spending time with relatives. In the summer of 1858 he spent time in Norway and married Norwegian Anna Glad (1834–1909), a painter and daughter of the commander of Akershus Fortress, Christian Glad. Gude also spent some time with Holmberg in Norway, painting watercolor sketches together near Christiania. Holmberg had settled to live in Düsseldorf where he spent the winter with Anna. They visited Finland in the summer of 1859 and spent time in Kuru.

Death

But by early 1860 he was having considerable difficulties with his lungs, relating to tuberculosis that he had already struggled with for years. In the spring they had a daughter, Betzy (who later became a composer) but the couple also ran into some financial troubles as they had a harder time selling paintings. The situation looked brighter again when he was invited to be a professor of landscape art in a new art school in Weimar. However, the invitation was cancelled and Werner was now bedridden with his sickness. As he died in September, many of his paintings were left unfinished. One of his sisters and an older brother had also died from the same sickness.

Legacy
Holmberg is the first Finnish painter to have received international recognition. His effect especially to Finnish landscape painting was large.

See also
 Finnish art

References 

1830 births
1860 deaths
Artists from Helsinki
People from the Grand Duchy of Finland
Finnish painters
Finnish emigrants to Germany